The 1975–76 Czechoslovak Extraliga season was the 33rd season of the Czechoslovak Extraliga, the top level of ice hockey in Czechoslovakia. 12 teams participated in the league, and TJ SONP Kladno won the championship.

First round

Final round

7th-12th place

1. Liga-Qualification 

 TJ Gottwaldov – LB Zvolen 4:3 (6:0, 4:2, 1:4, 1:3, 5:3, 1:4, 4:2)

External links
History of Czechoslovak ice hockey

Czechoslovak Extraliga seasons
Czech
1975–76 in Czechoslovak ice hockey